Kingstone is a civil parish and a large village in rural Herefordshire, England. It lies within the historic area of Archenfield, near the Welsh border, south-west of the city of Hereford. The parish church is dedicated to St. Michael and All Angels.

The village has both a primary school, which also serves nearby Thruxton, and a secondary school, Kingstone High School.

References

Villages in Herefordshire
Civil parishes in Herefordshire